Jens Teunckens (born 30 January 1998) is a Belgian professional footballer who plays as a goalkeeper for Lierse Kempenzonen.

Club career
A youth product of Club Brugge, Teunckens joined Antwerp on loan in 2018, and joined Antwerp permanently when the loan ended. Teunckens made his professional debut for Antwerp in a 2-1 Belgian First Division A win over K.A.S. Eupen on 9 May 2019.

On 31 August 2021, he joined RKC Waalwijk in the Netherlands on a one-year contract. In January 2022, Teunckens had his contract annulled and joined Belgian second tier side Lierse Kempenzonen.

International career
Teunckens was called up by the senior Belgium squad in October 2019 for a UEFA Euro 2020 qualifier against Kazakhstan.

Honours
Individual
 2015 UEFA European Under-17 Championship Team of the Tournament

References

External links
 
 Royal Antwerp Profile

1998 births
Living people
People from Geel
Footballers from Antwerp Province
Belgian footballers
Association football goalkeepers
Royal Antwerp F.C. players
Club Brugge KV players
AEK Larnaca FC players
RKC Waalwijk players
Lierse Kempenzonen players
Belgian Pro League players
Cypriot First Division players
Belgium youth international footballers
Belgian expatriate footballers
Expatriate footballers in Cyprus
Expatriate footballers in the Netherlands
Belgian expatriate sportspeople in Cyprus
Belgian expatriate sportspeople in the Netherlands